Gilvan (also Romanized as Gīlvān and Gīlavān) is a city in, and the capital of, Gilvan District of Tarom County, Zanjan province, Iran. At the 2006 census, its population was 2,036 in 541 households, when it was a village in Gilvan Rural District of the Central District. The following census in 2011 counted 2,426 people in 691 households. The latest census in 2016 showed a population of 2,508 people in 803 households; it was the largest village in its rural district.

After the census, Gilvan Rural District was separated from the Central District and became Gilvan District. The village of Gilvan became a city and capital of the newly established district.

References 

Tarom County

Cities in Zanjan Province

Populated places in Zanjan Province

Populated places in Tarom County